Jessica Ashley Lloyd (born 14 March 1995 in Oldham, England) is a British swimmer. At the 2012 Summer Olympics, she competed for the national team in the Women's 4 x 100 metre freestyle relay, finishing in 5th place in the final. She is a member of the City of Manchester Aquatics Swim Team with the Manchester Aquatics Centre as training location.

References

British female swimmers
Living people
Olympic swimmers of Great Britain
Swimmers at the 2012 Summer Olympics
British female freestyle swimmers
People from Oldham
Commonwealth Games medallists in swimming
1995 births
Commonwealth Games silver medallists for England
Commonwealth Games bronze medallists for England
Swimmers at the 2014 Commonwealth Games
21st-century British women
Medallists at the 2014 Commonwealth Games